FASA-Renault was a Spanish automobile manufacturer which produced Renault and Renault-based vehicles from 1951 to 2000. Since 2000 until the present, its factories are part of Renault España.

History 
The company was established in 1951 in Valladolid as FASA (Fabricación de Automóviles Sociedad Anónima de Valladolid) by Spanish interests, a license having been obtained to allow local production of Renault vehicles. In 1965 Renault increased its shareholding in the company from 15% to 49.9% and the company name was changed to FASA-Renault. Renault was permitted to become a major shareholder in the company in 1976 and by December 2000 FASA-Renault was fully owned by the Renault Group.

Most of the Renault range was assembled in Spain (Valladolid and Palencia), excluding the bigger cars like the 20/30 and 25. The Renault 7 which was produced by FASA-Renault from 1974 to 1984 is a locally developed four-door sedan version of the original Renault 5 hatchback.

References

See also
 Bulgarrenault
 MAVA-Renault
 Oyak-Renault
 Oltcit
 Polski Fiat

Defunct motor vehicle manufacturers of Spain